3scale is an internet technology company that develops API management software.

History 
3scale was co-founded by Steven Willmott and Martin Tantow in 2007. A public beta began in November 2008. The company's commercial product was released in March 2009. It sells API Management software called 3scale Connect and a premium version that comes with support and an SLA. A set of three additional APIs were released in October 2011.

In April 2012, 3scale released a new version of its API Management Platform and Infrastructure, including new features such as ActiveDocs, powered by the Swagger API framework developed by Wordnik, as well as allowing API providers to create interactive REST documentation out of the box.

In March 2013, 3scale received $4.2 million in funding to build additional functionality to the product and expand internationally.

On June 22, 2016, Red Hat announced the purchase of 3scale and the open sourcing of their software.

See also

API management
CA Technologies
MuleSoft
WSO2

References

External links
 
 3scale Blog

Development software companies
Software companies established in 2007
American companies established in 2007